The 1980–81 Calgary Flames season was the first season in Calgary and ninth for the Flames in the National Hockey League.  The Flames moved to southern Alberta from Atlanta, Georgia, where the franchise was known as the Atlanta Flames for the first eight years of its existence.  The Flames became the third major-league team to represent the city of Calgary after the Calgary Tigers of the 1920s, and the Calgary Cowboys, which had folded in 1977.

The Flames were purchased for $16 million USD by Nelson Skalbania in the spring of 1980.  Before the sale was even announced, he had already sold 50% of the franchise to a group of Calgary-based investors including Harley Hotchkiss and Normie Kwong.  On May 21, 1980, it was announced that the franchise was moving to Calgary.  While the Cowboys could not manage 2,000 season tickets three years previous, the Flames sold 10,000 full and half-season ticket packages in 1980, selling out the Stampede Corral for every game played there.

The Flames' first game was played October 9, ending as a 5–5 tie to the Quebec Nordiques.  While still in the East-coast dominated Patrick Division, the Flames finished 3rd, and qualified for the playoffs.  The franchise, which had won just two playoff games in Atlanta, won two playoff series in their first year in Calgary.  After sweeping the Chicago Black Hawks, Calgary then downed the Philadelphia Flyers in seven games before falling to the Minnesota North Stars in the league semi-final.

Kent Nilsson led the Flames in scoring, and his 82 assists and 131 points remain franchise records to this day.  Nilsson was also the Flames lone representative at the 1981 All-Star Game.

Regular season

Season standings

Schedule and results

Playoffs

Player statistics

Skaters
Note: GP = Games played; G = Goals; A = Assists; Pts = Points; PIM = Penalty minutes

†Denotes player spent time with another team before joining Calgary.  Stats reflect time with the Flames only.
‡Traded mid-season.
Bold denotes franchise record.

Goaltenders
Note: GP = Games played; TOI = Time on ice (minutes); W = Wins; L = Losses; OT = Overtime/shootout losses; GA = Goals against; SO = Shutouts; GAA = Goals against average

Transactions
The Flames were involved in the following transactions during the 1980–81 season.

Trades

Free agents

Draft picks

Calgary's picks at the 1980 NHL Entry Draft, held in Montreal, Quebec.

See also
1980–81 NHL season

References

Player stats: 2006–07 Calgary Flames Media Guide, p. 131.
Game log: 2006–07 Calgary Flames Media Guide, p. 141.
Team standings:  1980–81 NHL standings @hockeydb.com
Trades: Individual player pages at hockeydb.com

Calgary Flames seasons
Calgary Flames season, 1980-81
Cal